The Krugerrand is a South African coin, first minted on 3 July 1967 to help market South African gold and produced by Rand Refinery and the South African Mint. The name is a compound of Paul Kruger, the former President of the South African Republic (depicted on the obverse), and rand, the South African unit of currency. On the reverse side of the Krugerrand is a pronking springbok, South Africa's national animal. 

By 1980 the Krugerrand accounted for more than 90% of the global gold coin market and was the number one choice for investors buying gold. However, during the 1980s and 1990s, Krugerrands fell out of favor as some western countries forbade import of the Krugerrand because of its association with the apartheid government of South Africa.

Although gold Krugerrand coins have no face value, they are considered legal tender in South Africa by the South African Reserve Bank Act (SARBA) of 1989.

In 2017, the Rand Refinery began minting silver versions, which have the same overall design as the gold coin.

History

The Krugerrand was introduced in 1967 as a vehicle for private ownership of gold. It was minted in a copper-gold alloy more durable than pure gold. By 1980 the Krugerrand accounted for 90% of the global gold coin market. That year, South Africa introduced three smaller coins containing  of gold.

Economic sanctions against South Africa for its policy of apartheid made the Krugerrand an illegal import in many Western countries during the 1970s and 1980s, with the United States,  which had historically been the largest market for the coin, banning imports in 1985: the previous year, over US$600 million of Krugerrands had been marketed in the country.

Most of these sanctions were removed in 1991 after the South African government took steps to end its apartheid policies.

Over 50 million ounces of gold Krugerrand coins have been sold since production started in 1967.

Variations and imitations

During the bull market in gold of the 1970s, the gold Krugerrand quickly became the primary choice for gold investors worldwide. Between 1974 and 1985, it is estimated that 22 million gold Krugerrand coins were imported into the United States alone. This huge success of the Krugerrand encouraged other gold-producing countries to mint and issue gold bullion coins of their own, including the Canadian Gold Maple Leaf in 1979, the Australian Nugget in 1987, the Chinese Gold Panda in 1982, the American Gold Eagle in 1986, and the British Britannia coin in 1987.

Properties

The coin is so named because the obverse, designed by Otto Schultz, bears the face of Boer statesman Paul Kruger, four-term president of the old South African Republic. The reverse depicts a springbok, the national animal of South Africa. The image was designed by Coert Steynberg, and was previously used on the reverse of the earlier South African five shillings (1947-51 and 1953-59) and 50 Cents (1961-64) coin. The name "South Africa" and the gold content are inscribed in both Afrikaans and English (as can be seen on the pictures of the coin).

The word "Krugerrand" is a registered trademark owned by Rand Refinery Limited, of Germiston.

Proof Krugerrands

The South African Mint Company produces limited edition proof Krugerrands intended to be collectors' items rather than bullion investments. These coins are priced above bullion value, although non-proof Krugerrands also have a premium above gold bullion value. They can be distinguished from the bullion Krugerrands by the number of serrations on the edge of the coin. Proof coins have 220 edge serrations, while bullion coins have 160.

50th Anniversary Krugerrands

2017 marked the 50th year of issuance (1967–2017) and to commemorate the anniversary, the South African Mint produced "Premium Uncirculated" versions in gold (.916 or 22 carat) and for the first time also in platinum (.999 fine) and silver (.999 fine). The issue limit for these commemorative platinum, gold and silver coins was 2,017 for platinum, 5,000 for gold and 1,000,000 for silver. The commemorative issues are distinguished by a '50' privy seal mark above the springbok design on the reverse for the platinum and silver issues and to the right of the springbok design on the gold issues. In addition to the "Premium Uncirculated" issue, 15,000 silver "Proof" krugerrands were also issued as well as "Proof" krugerrands in gold and platinum.

Export control

The South African Reserve Bank restricts the exportation of Krugerrands by a South African resident to a non-resident to a maximum of R30,000 (about US$2,100 or €1,870 as of June 2018). Visitors to South Africa can export up to 15 coins by declaring the items to the South African Revenue Service.

Charitable donations

In the 21st century, Krugerrands have received media attention in the United States after anonymous donors have left the valuable coin in the Salvation Army's annual "Christmas Kettle" donation jars in various cities around the country.

See also
 Bullion
 Bullion coin
 Economy of South Africa
 Gold as an investment
 Inflation hedge
 Silver as an investment
 Mosi-oa-Tunya (coin)
 Yamagata Television System (A Japanese broadcasting station that was in the business of issuing gold coins in the 1980s.)

References

External links

Le cours du Krugerrand 1 once. 
Krugerrand
Rand Refinery
The South African Mint Company
Collection of Krugerrand photos
Gold Ounce (1 oz) Krugerrand, Coin Type from South Africa

Bullion coins of South Africa
Gold bullion coins
Silver bullion coins